This was the first edition of the tournament.

Kevin Anderson won the title, defeating Sam Querrey in the final, 4–6, 6–3, 7–6(7–1).

Seeds
The top four seeds receive a bye into the second round.

Draw

Finals

Top half

Bottom half

Qualifying

Seeds

Qualifiers

Qualifying draw

First qualifier

Second qualifier

Third qualifier

Fourth qualifier

References
 Main Draw
 Qualifying Draw

2018 ATP World Tour
2018 Singles